The Abbeville–Grimes Railway Company , also known as the A&G Railroad after 1994, was a shortline railroad formerly operating from Grimes to Abbeville, Alabama, . The railroad was merged with the Bay Line Railroad in 1996 and continued operation under the new name.

History

Construction of the Alabama Midland Railway began in 1887 and completed its line through the region in 1890. The Abbeville Southern Railway was created in September 1892 to build a branch line from Grimes, reaching Abbeville in December of the following year. Following the completion of construction, the line was transferred to the Alabama Midland, which operated the line until it was merged with the Savannah, Florida and Western Railway on September 2, 1901.

The Atlantic Coast Line absorbed the SF&W in 1902. A pair of mergers, first into the Seaboard Coast Line in 1967, and later the Seaboard System in 1983, would precede the final merger into CSX Transportation in 1986. In the late 1980s CSX sought to abandon the line from Grimes to Abbeville. However, the Stone Container Corporation, operator of a woodchip mill near Abbeville and the parent company of the Bay Line Railroad, sought to purchase the branch and preserve service, which it did on March 1, 1989. The new line reached its parent railroad at Dothan via trackage rights over CSX between Grimes and Dothan.

Under the Seaboard Coast Line, the local freight over the branch line was scheduled to originate and terminate at Grimes. The local was numbered 641 while traveling towards Abbeville, and 640 for the return trip to Grimes. This local worked after the daily Montgomery bound morning local passed through the area with fresh carloads for the Abbeville branch, and returned well before the return trip local out of Montgomery to Dothan arrived again to retrieve cars from train 640's earlier trip. On October 28, 1979, the scheduled 641 and 640 trains were removed from the Waycross Division timetable and instead the branch was operated independent of an established schedule. Under the final years of the Seaboard Coast Line the branch was operated as a local road switcher with permanently stationed locomotives on the line or with an as-needed local launched from Dothan. The Seaboard System and CSX Transportation operated the branch on an as needed basis with a switch engine stationed at Abbeville to work the Stone Container Corp woodchip mill there.

Rail Services Inc. was responsible for operations of the Abbeville–Grimes Railway using locomotives and rolling stock supplied by the Bay Line Railroad. On January 1, 1994, the Bay Line was sold to Rail Management Corporation with the Abbeville–Grimes Railway included in the purchase. The name was shortened to the A&G railroad and continued to operate with Bay Line locomotives. The A&G was formally merged into the Bay Line on June 26, 1996, and ceased to exist as a separate entity.

References

Defunct Alabama railroads